Senator Wagoner may refer to:

Keith Wagoner (fl. 2010s), Washington State Senate
Mark Wagoner (born 1971), Ohio State Senate
Thomas Wagoner (born 1942), Alaska State Senate

See also
Senator Wagner (disambiguation)